Geroldsgrün is a municipality in the Hof district of Bavaria, Germany.

Geography

Boroughs

 Dürrenwaid 
 Dürrenwaiderhammer
 Langenbachtal
 Langenau
 Langenbach
 Lotharheil
 Mühlleiten
 Geroldsgrün  
 Geroldsreuth
 Großenreuth
 Hermesgrün 
 Hertwegsgrün   
 Hirschberglein     
 Silberstein  
 Steinbach
 Untersteinbach

The boroughs of Geroldsgrün for the most part are registered air health resorts.

History
The earliest mention of the town is 1323 as Gerhartsgrün. Until recently Geroldsgrün always has been a bordertown between various dominions. In the past it was on the border of the Archdiocese of Bamberg to Grafen von Orlamünde, later between the diocese and Margravate Bayreuth-Kulmbach and in recent times until the reunification between West and East Germany.

In 1972 the former municipality of Dürrenwaid becomes part of Geroldsgrün  and with the dissolution of the district of Naila Geroldsgrün becomes part of the rural district of Hof. On 1 May 1978 Geroldsgrün reached its current size with the inclusion of Langenbach and Steinbach.

Climate
The annual average temperature in Geroldsgrün is 6.7 °C and the average rainfall is 1,002 mm.

References

Hof (district)